Eduardo Martins Nunes (born March 20, 1984 in Alegrete, Rio Grande do Sul) or simply Nunes, is a Brazilian defensive midfielder. He currently plays for Brasil de Pelotas.

Honours
Campeonato Brasileiro Série B: 2005
Campeonato Gaúcho: 2006, 2007

References

External links
 sambafoot
 CBF
 zerozero.pt
 Guardian Stats Centre

1984 births
Living people
Brazilian footballers
Grêmio Foot-Ball Porto Alegrense players
Clube Náutico Capibaribe players
Guarani FC players
Association football midfielders
People from Alegrete
Sportspeople from Rio Grande do Sul